Michael Silverton is an American computer scientist.

Biography
Silverton built the first all-optical Ethernet in the first mile networks in Palo Alto, California in 1999 to 2000, as the result of research and work that first began in 1991 in Phoenix, Arizona.

Fiberhood Networks, Inc, a Silicon Valley company championed by Silverton, and co-founded Sinuhe Hardegree and Jonathan Usuka, along with  Christopher Lein, Chris Minchberg, Keith Cooley, and Joe Villareal, failed financially, but the engineering success and ensuing industry enthusiasm from the likes of Pirelli, Corning, France Telecom, Telstra, SBC Communications, and industry standards groups like the IEEE, all validated a proof of concept for this first field-operational implementation of its kind.
The Information superhighway term was used in the National Information Infrastructure effort of the 1990s.
Silverton's 1997 Stanford University thesis described an "Information Superdriveway", extending early analogies of "internet as roadway" connecting consumers to the information city streets and global superhighways.
The company existed from about 1998 through 2001.
It partnered with PAIX, an early Palo Alto Internet exchange.
In 1999 Silverton became founding director of the Open Access Alliance of the Bay Area, a group advocating for independent Internet service providers.
In 2001 the company still planned to expand.

Silverton presented his experience to the Ethernet in the first mile (EFM) study group in March 2001.
After several years of industry collaboration, the standard was published in June 2004.
In 2004 he was interviewed as an early adopter of voice over Internet Protocol (VoIP) technology.

References

External links
 

People from Palo Alto, California
Stanford University alumni
American computer businesspeople
Internet pioneers
Living people
Year of birth missing (living people)